Yero Dia  (born 5 January 1982, in Roubaix) is a French football player who currently plays in Greece for Levadiakos.

External links
worldsoccerstats

soccerterminal

1982 births
Living people
French footballers
Sportspeople from Roubaix
Levadiakos F.C. players
Ethnikos Asteras F.C. players
Association football defenders
Wasquehal Football players
Footballers from Hauts-de-France
Expatriate footballers in Greece
Expatriate footballers in Belgium
French expatriate sportspeople in Greece
French expatriate sportspeople in Belgium
French expatriate footballers
R.A.A. Louviéroise players